Gang banger may refer to:

A participant in a gang bang
A member of a gang